van Sprang is a surname. Notable people with the surname include:

Alan van Sprang (born 1971), Canadian actor
Bert van Sprang (1944–2015), Dutch astronomer

See also
3098 van Sprang, main-belt asteroid

Surnames of Dutch origin